The Mayor of Doncaster is a directly elected mayor, first elected on 2 May 2002, taking on the executive function of City of Doncaster Council. The incumbent mayor is Ros Jones elected as a member of the Labour Party, who won the election held on 2 May 2013. The position is different from the long-existing and largely ceremonial, annually appointed mayors who are now known as the civic mayor of Doncaster.

In May 2012, voters decided in a referendum to keep the position of directly elected mayor.

List of elected mayors

Timeline

Elections

2021

The election took place on 6 May 2021.

2017
The fifth mayoral election took place on 4 May 2017.

2013
The fourth mayoral election took place on 2 May 2013.

2009
The third mayoral election was held on 4 June 2009, the same day as the Elections to the European Parliament. Peter Davies of the English Democrats won. Placing second in terms of first preference votes, Davies beat Michael Maye, an independent with backing from the Liberal Democrats and Green Party, after second preference votes were counted.

In the elections of 2002 and 2005, Martin Winter won the mayoralty.

2005

2002

Referendums

2012
A referendum was held after being triggered by the councils' ruling Labour group on the retention of the mayor system or reverting to the previous leader and cabinet system. The results of the referendum were in favour of retaining the mayor.

2001
An all-postal ballot was held on 20 September 2001 on whether to establish an executive mayor, resulting in a majority of the electorate voting in favour.

References

External links
 The Mayor

 
Doncaster
Doncaster